The Préfecture des Hauts-de-Seine is an administrative building located in Nanterre, in the inner suburbs of Paris, France.

Designed specifically to host the administrative offices of the préfecture of the Hauts-de-Seine département, the building has a wide base below its -tall tower.

See also
 Skyscraper
 List of tallest structures in Paris

External links
 Préfecture des Hauts-de-Seine (Emporis)

Skyscraper office buildings in France
La Défense
Government buildings completed in 1974
1974 establishments in France